Guidestones may refer to
The Georgia Guidestones, a monument
Guidestones (web series), an interactive conspiracy web series
Fictional artefacts featured in the video game Homeworld